Aubri Esters was an activist who fought to expand rights and treatment accessibility for people who use drugs. Esters co-founded the coalition, Safe Injection Facilities Massachusetts Now! (SIFMA Now!) in September 2016.

Early life 
Esters was born in Beverly, MA on May 11, 1985, to mental health counselor Laura Pelkus-Esters and clinical psychologist Joshua Peter Esters.

In school, Esters was known to stand up for classmates when they were mistreated. As a preteen, Esters was so adept at computers, she figured out how to hack into her middle school's web system. Growing up, Esters, her parents, and her younger sister, Cheraya, moved often due to the ministry they were involved with. By age 15, Esters had lived in 9 different communities.

In her late teens, Esters transitioned and legally made her name Aubri. Coming out as a transgender woman caused Esters to lose close relationships, but drove her passion for activism. Esters' sister, Cheraya, who is also queer, credits Esters with giving her the safety and strength to come out.

When she was 18, Esters began using drugs. After a couple of years, Esters was spending up to $300 daily on her drug use and suffered from abscesses. Esters experienced homelessness and stated services available at Long Island supported her recovery from homelessness and chaotic drug use. For over a decade, Esters used methadone to treat chaotic opioid use.

Esters lived with fibromyalgia and a heart condition. She used a walker.

Esters was a drummer. She studied interrelated media on a scholarship at MassArt.

Activism and advocacy 
Esters spoke about herself as a “person who happens to use drugs.” She taught medical practitioners and politicians about the challenges of life on the streets and the discrimination and abuse she and other people who use drugs faced. Esters always carried Narcan and saved many people's lives from drug overdose.

For 8 years, Esters operated an unsanctioned drug consumption space in East Somerville, where she trained many people in how to safely and effectively respond to overdoses.

Esters is responsible for bringing the first fentanyl test strips to harm reduction organizations in Boston.

Esters was a community organizer with the Mass Alliance of HUD Tenants (MAHT) group, a drug user health educator with Victory Programs, and an organizer with the Boston Homeless Solidarity Committee (BHSC).

In 2016, Esters co-founded the City Rent Subsidy Coalition, a coalition of over thirty groups, organizing to hold Boston accountable to prevent the displacement of low-income residents. The coalition demanded that Boston rehouse its homeless population through the creation of a city-funded rent subsidy program.

In 2016, Esters was on the winning team of a hackathon seeking methods to prevent drug addiction and deaths. Esters’ team presented the idea of a mobile van that would visit neighborhoods known for drug-use in Boston. Staff would distribute sterile needles, provide counseling and two-days worth of Suboxone. Esters' innovative contributions have materialized as The Care Zone van, funded by the Kraft Center for Community Health at Massachusetts General Hospital, staffed by AHOPE and BHCHP, as well as the Victory Programs Mobile Prevention Team van.

In 2016, Esters co-founded SIFMA Now!, the first Massachusetts coalition to organize and garner public support of supervised injection facilities and drug harm reduction initiatives.

Esters advocated for people who use drugs in policy conversations with local government officials. In 2018, Esters was a representative on the Massachusetts Harm Reduction Commission. Esters urged the state to launch a pilot for supervised consumption facilities. The pilot gained support from the Massachusetts Medical Society. Esters taught the Commission that people who use drugs deserve to have a sense of dignity and safety regardless of what substance they use or how they use them."

In 2019, Esters pressed Mayor Marty Walsh to reduce the number of police officers at Mass and Cass.  Esters provided insight as a person with lived experience, warning that police harassment of homeless people resting at Mass and Cass encouraged homeless people to use methamphetamine as a means to remain awake, which inadvertently caused symptoms of meth use in irratic and violent behavior. Esters educated stakeholders about how police surveillance pushes people to hastily inject drugs, to avoid being detained for carrying illegal substances, leading to overdose and other health hazards.

Esters refused to let people ignore the urgency of the overdose crisis. Once, she interrupted mayor Walsh to express, “My people are dying!” Walsh publicly shared sadness over Esters death, and credited Esters for helping him apply more evidence-based practices to policies regarding substance use. Dr. Mark Eisenberg, said he imagined Esters being dissatisfied with Walsh’s sadness and expressing that if he meant the words he said, he’d work to legalize safe injection facilities. 

In 2019, Esters told the Massachusetts Legislature that treating chaotic drug use meant treating the inequity, racism, poverty, and trauma that leads people to develop chaotic drug use. 

In 2019, Esters attended a conference on behalf of the New England Users Union (NEUU), to teach participants about how to prevent fatal overdose. Jess Tilley, executive director of NEUU, said of Esters, "We've lost one of our strongest champions in her prime."

Before she died, Esters was planning to work with Dr. Miriam Harris, an addiction medicine fellow at Boston Medical Center, on a study that would determine how the COVID-19 pandemic has impacted people who use drugs.

Death 
On June 4, 2020, Esters was found dead, after her mother couldn't get ahold of her and requested a wellness check be carried out by law enforcement at Esters' apartment in Mass and Cass, near BMC. Esters died of a drug overdose in the middle of the first year of the coronavirus pandemic. Her death occurred during a spike in deaths from fentanyl overdose caused, in part, by the isolation brought on by social distancing. Social distancing forced many people who use drugs to use without the company of people who'd typically reverse their overdoses with naloxone. Esters died days after returning from spending three months with her mother in Florida.  Months prior to her death, Esters publicly expressed how isolation is killing people who use drugs.

Posthumous dedications 
On June 18, 2020, Congresswoman Ayanna Pressley introduced a congressional record statement remembering and honoring the life of Aubri Esters.

$6,547 was raised in Esters' honor and distributed equally to organizations meaningful to Esters; Boston Users Union, SIFMA Now!, Whose Corner Is It Anyway?, and Families for Justice as Healing.

“Aubri’s Law”, a bill that would permit the creation of supervised injection facilities in Massachusetts, was named for Esters.

In 2021, Esters’ sister, Cheraya, assisted Texas Harm Reduction Alliance in building a mobile clinic which offers wound care, HIV testing, showers, toilets, WIFI, and charging stations to those experiencing homelessness.

Related commentary 
Esters shared, that she’d lost a lot of friends to overdose, many of which she was present for. Esters always expressed urgency around the thousands of lives “we’ve wasted” to fatal overdose. Esters told her friends that if she were to have died of an overdose, she would want the world to know it.

Further reading 
Fentanyl Overdose Reduction Checking Analysis Study

MA Coalition for Supervised Consumption Sites Urges Action on Aubri's Law

Naming the sites of the opioid crisis in Boston: a political issue

Prevalence and correlates of non-fatal overdose among people who use drugs: findings from rapid assessments in Massachusetts, 2017–2019

References 

Activists from Boston
Addiction medicine
American drug policy reform activists
Drug culture
Drug paraphernalia
Drug safety
Harm reduction
LGBT people from Massachusetts
Medical hygiene
Medical prevention
Public policy
Drug policy
Drug-related deaths
Vulnerable adults
Substance intoxication
Substance abuse
Substance abuse counselors
Transgender women